Vårdinge by folkhögskola is a folk high school located near a lake in Vårdinge, Sweden. 

Its focus is on Arts and Craftsmanship. The school is inspired by antroposophy and offers all standard courses that ensure a secondary school (gymnasium) diploma. It is at a commuter distance from Stockholm.

Courses

Some of the courses available are:
 Art
 Woodcrafting
 Pottery
 Gardening

References

External links
 Vårdinge by folkhögskola

Södermanland
Folk high schools in Sweden